Camp Douglas was established in October 1862, during the American Civil War, as a small military garrison about three miles east of Salt Lake City, Utah, to protect the overland mail route and telegraph lines along the Central Overland Route. In 1878, the post was renamed Fort Douglas. It was officially closed in 1991 pursuant to BRAC action and most of the property was turned over to the University of Utah. Many of the fort's buildings are preserved and used by the university for a variety of purposes. The Fort Douglas Military Museum is housed in two former barrack buildings, and a small section of the original post is still used by the U.S. Army Reserve. The fort was designated a National Historic Landmark in 1975, for its role in the Civil War and in furthering the settlement of Utah.

History

Establishment
Early in the Civil War, the threat of violence increased with the withdrawal of Federal troops from the West for use against the Confederate States of America. Colonel Patrick Connor was ordered to reestablish a military presence with volunteer soldiers in the Utah Territory. He selected a site east of Salt Lake City, and Camp Douglas, named after Senator Stephen A. Douglas, was officially established there on October 26, 1862. Connor's men were Union volunteers from both California and Nevada. The post served as headquarters for the District of Utah in the Department of the Pacific.

Regular Army arrives, 1866–1874
Following the end of the Civil War, between 1866 and 1898, the fort was part of the Department of the Platte. Its importance increased when the Union Pacific and Central Pacific railroads joined rails at Promontory Summit, Utah, on May 10, 1869, completing the Transcontinental Railroad.

1878–1902
Through the efforts of Utah's U.S. Sen. Thomas Kearns, the fort became a regimental post.

World War I

During World War I, the fort was used as an internment camp for German citizens who lived in the United States, and it was also a POW camp for Imperial German Navy prisoners. One of the crews kept there was from the SMS Cormoran, which had left the German colony of Tsingtao, China, at the beginning of the war and stopped at Guam in December 1914 to refuel and take on provisions. Denied the coal needed for their boilers, the German captain reluctantly submitted to detention. When the United States entered the war on the Allied side in 1917, the crew were made prisoners of war and were sent to Fort Douglas.

Interwar period
In 1922, the fort became the base of the 38th Infantry, which remained there until August 1940.

World War II
Following Japan's attack on Pearl Harbor, Fort Douglas became an Army Air Field in conjunction with Salt Lake City Municipal Airport and housed the 7th Bombardment Group operating B-17 Flying Fortresses. However, Fort Douglas proper was taken over by the Army ground forces when fears of a Japanese attack of the U.S. mainland caused the 9th Service Command Headquarters to move from Utah to the Presidio of San Francisco.

Final years, 1945–1991
After World War II, the Army began disposing of its land, transferring it to the University of Utah, located adjacent to it. However, it maintained Army Reserve functions there for decades, notably with the 96th Army Reserve Command under the command of Maj. Gen. Michael B. Kauffman, who had spent much of his Army career at the fort and was instrumental in keeping it alive well past its announced closing in the 1970s. The Fort Douglas Military Museum is housed in a building named after Maj. Gen. Kauffman, who founded the museum and built it into one of the United States' premier military museums featuring exhibits from all branches of the Armed Services.

Between 1962 and 1973, Fort Douglas was the site of the Deseret Test Center (Buildings 103 and 105) with the responsibility of evaluating chemical and biological weapons, although no tests were actually performed on the base.

On October 26, 1991, the fort closed officially, though the Utah National Guard maintained control of the museum, and the 96th ARCOM received the parts of the fort that were not deeded to the university.

1991–Present

Armed Forces Reserve Center

A small portion of the southwestern section of the original fort remains in use by the United States military. This portion of the fort is designated the Stephen A. Douglas Armed Forces Reserve Center. The reserve center consists of 51 acres, and includes the historic Soldier's Circle, along with several sub-installation buildings.

The center hosts offices, along with training and support space for 'headquarters staff for two Army Reserve commands, and staff from other Army, Navy and Marine Reserve units'. There have been some attempts to relocate the center to allow the University of Utah to grow its campus. A law requires the property be given to the University of Utah, without charge, once the military declares it surplus.

Commands hosted
As of 2021, the commands hosted at the reserve center include:

 76th Operational Response Command
 807th Medical Command (Deployment Support)

University of Utah Campus
In 1991 the University of Utah received much of the fort's former property. During the 2002 Winter Olympics held in Salt Lake City, much of the university's campus was used to host events. The Olympic Organizing Committee and university built the Olympic Village to house participating athletes on former fort property; the village housing now serves as on-campus housing for university students. Stilwell Field is used as a parking lot during special events, such as football games. The Officers' Club building is used as a conference center by the university, and several of the officer's quarters house university departments (such as the American Indian Resource Center).

There has been some controversy surrounding the university's stewardship of the historic fort property. In 2015 it was revealed that during construction work to upgrade the university's electrical system, buried period artifacts had been removed and discarded at a landfill.

Cemetery

A cemetery was established in 1862 about a mile south of the original parade grounds. In 1864, the soldiers at the post improved the cemetery significantly. They erected a monument in the center dedicated to the memory of the soldiers killed during the Bear River Massacre. They also constructed a red sandstone wall around the cemetery, with a steel gate located at the north end. The following year, a smaller monument was added for Utah Gov. James D. Doty following his death and burial in the cemetery. Later, the cemetery was expanded to accommodate a larger number of burials, not only from the fort, but also from Fort Cameron following its closure. A special section of the cemetery was also added for the German prisoners of war who died here during World War II.

The Fort Douglas Cemetery continues to be an active federal military cemetery, actively maintained. A list of cemetery burials is available through the Utah History Research Center's cemetery database . The cemetery was damaged during the 2020 Utah windstorm, during which hurricane-force winds knocked down large trees, damaging headstones and other historic features of the cemetery.

See also

 List of National Historic Landmarks in Utah
 National Register of Historic Places listings in Salt Lake City, Utah
 Camp Floyd
 List of military installations in Utah
 Statue of Patrick Edward Connor

Notes

Sources
Madsen, Brigham D. The Shoshoni Frontier and the Bear River Massacre (Salt Lake City: University of Utah Press, 1985)
Hibbard, Charles G. Fort Douglas, Utah: A Frontier Fort (Vestige Press, 1999)

External links

Historic Fort Douglas, University of Utah (archived website)
Fort Douglas: Building History, a story map created by the Utah Division of State History and Fort Douglas Military Museum
Fort Douglas Military Museum Association 

Douglas
American Civil War army posts
Douglas
Military and war museums in Utah
Museums in Salt Lake County, Utah
University of Utah
Closed installations of the United States Army
Formerly Used Defense Sites in Utah
Utah in the American Civil War
Utah Territory
1862 establishments in Utah Territory
Douglas
Historic districts on the National Register of Historic Places in Utah
Internment of German Americans
National Historic Landmarks in Utah
National Register of Historic Places in Salt Lake City
Historic American Buildings Survey in Utah
University and college buildings on the National Register of Historic Places in Utah
World War I prisoner-of-war camps
World War I internment camps